Left-libertarianism, also known as egalitarian libertarianism, left-wing libertarianism, or social libertarianism, is a political philosophy and type of libertarianism that stresses both individual freedom and social equality. Left-libertarianism represents several related yet distinct approaches to political and social theory. Its classical usage refers to anti-authoritarian varieties of left-wing politics such as anarchism, especially social anarchism, whose adherents call it libertarianism, communalism, and libertarian Marxism, collectively termed libertarian socialism. A portion of the left wing of the green movement, including adherents of Murray Bookchin's social ecology, are also generally considered left-libertarian.

In the United States, left-libertarianism represents the left wing of the libertarian movement, including the political positions associated with academic philosophers Hillel Steiner, Philippe Van Parijs, and Peter Vallentyne that combine self-ownership with an egalitarian approach to natural resources. This is done to distinguish libertarian views on the nature of property and capital, usually along left–right or socialist–capitalist lines. Although libertarianism in the United States has become associated with classical liberalism and minarchism, with right-libertarianism being more known than left-libertarianism, political usage of the term until then was associated exclusively with anti-capitalism, libertarian socialism, and social anarchism; in most parts of the world, such an association still predominates.

Left-libertarians are skeptical of, or fully against, private ownership of natural resources, arguing in contrast to right-libertarians that neither claiming nor mixing one's labor with natural resources is enough to generate full private property rights, and maintain that natural resources should be held in an egalitarian manner, either unowned or owned collectively. Those left-libertarians who are more lenient towards private property support different property norms and theories, such as usufruct or under the condition that recompense is offered to the local or even global community, such as the Steiner–Vallentyne school. Other currents of thought identified with left-libertarianism include adherents of Henry George's land tax ideas and Pierre-Joseph Proudhon's mutualism, and more recent forms of left-wing market anarchism (or market-oriented left-libertarianism), including Samuel Konkin III's agorism.

Definition 

Some political scientists and writers classify the forms of libertarianism into two or more groups, such as left-libertarianism and right-libertarianism, to distinguish libertarian views on the nature of property and capital. In the United States, proponents of free-market anti-capitalism consciously label themselves as left-libertarians and part of the libertarian left.

As a term, left-libertarianism has been used to refer to various political economic philosophies emphasizing individual liberty. With the modern development of right-libertarian co-opting the term libertarian in the mid-20th century to advocate laissez-faire capitalism and strong private property rights such as land, infrastructure, and natural resources, left-libertarianism has been used more often to differentiate between the two forms, especially concerning property rights.

According to Jennifer Carlson, right-libertarianism is the dominant form of libertarianism in the United States, while left-libertarianism "has become a more predominant aspect of politics in western European democracies over the past three decades." Left-libertarianism also includes "the decentralist who wishes to limit and devolve State power, to the syndicalist who wants to abolish it altogether. It can even encompass the Fabians and the social democrats who wish to socialize the economy but who still see a limited role for the State."

According to the textbook definition in The Routledge Companion to Social and Political Philosophy, left-libertarianism has at least three meanings, writing:
In its oldest sense, it is a synonym either for anarchism in general or social anarchism in particular. Later it became a term for the left or Konkinite wing of the free-market libertarian movement, and has since come to cover a range of pro-market but anti-capitalist positions, mostly individualist anarchist, including agorism and mutualism, often with an implication of sympathies (such as for radical feminism or the labor movement) not usually shared by anarcho-capitalists. In a third sense it has recently come to be applied to a position combining individual self-ownership with an egalitarian approach to natural resources; most proponents of this position are not anarchists.

The Stanford Encyclopedia of Philosophy distinguishes left-libertarianism from right-libertarianism, arguing:
Libertarianism is often thought of as 'right-wing' doctrine. This, however, is mistaken for at least two reasons. First, on social—rather than economic—issues, libertarianism tends to be 'left-wing'. It opposes laws that restrict consensual and private sexual relationships between adults (e.g., gay sex, non-marital sex, and deviant sex), laws that restrict drug use, laws that impose religious views or practices on individuals, and compulsory military service. Second, in addition to the better-known version of libertarianism—right-libertarianism—there is also a version known as 'left-libertarianism'. Both endorse full self-ownership, but they differ with respect to the powers agents have to appropriate unappropriated natural resources (land, air, water, etc.).

Terminology 
As a term, left-libertarianism is used by some political analysts, academics, and media sources, especially in the United States, to contrast it with the libertarian philosophy, which is supportive of free-market capitalism and strong private property rights, in addition to supporting limited government and self-ownership which is common to both libertarian types.

Peter Vallentyne describes left-libertarianism as the type of libertarianism holding that "unappropriated natural resources belong to everyone in some egalitarian manner." Similarly, Charlotte and Lawrence Becker maintain that left-libertarianism most often refers to the political position that holds natural resources are originally common property.

Followers of Samuel Edward Konkin III, who characterized agorism as a form of left-libertarianism and strategic branch of left-wing market anarchism, use the terminology as outlined by Roderick T. Long, who describes left-libertarianism as "an integration, or I'd argue, a reintegration of libertarianism with concerns that are traditionally thought of as being concerns of the left. That includes concerns for worker empowerment, worry about plutocracy, concerns about feminism and various kinds of social equality."

Anthony Gregory maintains that libertarianism "can refer to any number of varying and at times mutually exclusive political orientations." Gregory describes left-libertarianism as maintaining an interest in personal freedom, having sympathy for egalitarianism and opposing social hierarchy, preferring a liberal lifestyle, opposing big business, and having a New Left opposition to imperialism and war. Although some American libertarians may reject the political spectrum, others have written about libertarianism's left-wing opposition to authoritarian rule and argued that libertarianism is fundamentally a left-wing position. Rothbard himself previously made the same point, rejecting the association of statism with the left.

Philosophy 
While all libertarians begin with a conception of personal autonomy from which they argue in favor of civil liberties and a reduction or elimination of the state, left-libertarianism encompasses those libertarian beliefs that claim the Earth's natural resources belong to everyone in an egalitarian manner, either unowned or owned collectively.

Traditionally, left-libertarian schools are communist and market abolitionist, advocating the eventual replacement of money with labor vouchers or decentralized planning. Contemporary left-libertarians such as Hillel Steiner, Peter Vallentyne, Philippe Van Parijs, Michael Otsuka, and David Ellerman believe the appropriation of land must leave "enough and as good" for others or be taxed by society to compensate for the exclusionary effects of private property.

State 
There are a number of different left-libertarian positions on the state, which can range from advocating for the complete abolition of the state, to advocating for a more decentralized and limited government with social ownership of the economy. According to Sheldon Richman of the Independent Institute, other left-libertarians "prefer that corporate privileges be repealed before the regulatory restrictions on how those privileges may be exercised."

Property rights 
Left-libertarians generally uphold self-ownership and oppose strong private property rights, instead supporting the egalitarian distribution of natural resources. Other left-libertarians believe that neither claiming nor mixing one's labor with natural resources is enough to generate full private property rights and maintain that natural resources ought to be held in an egalitarian manner, either unowned or owned collectively.

Political scientist Peter Mclaverty notes it has been argued that socialist values are incompatible with the concept of self-ownership when this concept is considered "the core feature of libertarianism" and socialism is defined as holding "that we are social beings, that society should be organised, and individuals should act, so as to promote the common good, that we should strive to achieve social equality and promote democracy, community and solidarity." However, political philosopher Nicholas Vrousalis has also argued that "property rights [...] do not pass judgment as to what rights individuals have to their own person [...] [and] to the external world" and that "the nineteenth-century egalitarian libertarians were not misguided in thinking that a thoroughly libertarian form of communism is possible at the level of principle."

Economics 
Other left-libertarians make a libertarian reading of progressive and social-democratic economics to advocate a universal basic income. Building on Michael Otsuka's conception of "robust libertarian self-ownership", Karl Widerquist argues that a universal basic income must be large enough to maintain individual independence regardless of the market value of resources because people in contemporary society have been denied direct access to enough resources with which they could otherwise maintain their existence in the absence of interference by people who control access to resources.

Schools of thought

Anarchism 

Anarchism is a political philosophy that advocates stateless societies characterized by self-governed, non-hierarchical, voluntary institutions. It developed in the 19th century from the secular or religious thought of the Enlightenment, particularly Jean-Jacques Rousseau's arguments for the moral centrality of freedom.

In France, revolutionaries began using anarchiste in a positive light as early as September 1793. Pierre-Joseph Proudhon was the first self-proclaimed anarchist (a label he adopted in his treatise What Is Property?) and is often described as the founder of modern anarchist theory.

Proudhon's opposition to the state, organized religion, and certain capitalist practices inspired subsequent anarchists and made him one of the leading social thinkers of his time. However, French anarchist Joseph Déjacque castigated Proudhon for his sexist economic and political views in a scathing letter written in 1857. He argued that "it is not the product of his or her labour that the worker has a right to, but to the satisfaction of his or her needs, whatever may be their nature." Déjacque later named his anarchist publication Le Libertaire, Journal du Mouvement Social (Libertarian, Journal of the Social Movement), printed from 9 June 1858 to 4 February 1861. In the mid-1890s, French libertarian communist Sébastien Faure began publishing a new Le Libertaire while France's Third Republic enacted the so-called villainous laws (lois scélérates), which banned anarchist publications in France. Libertarianism has been a synonym for anarchism since this time, especially in Europe.

Classical liberalism and Georgism 

Contemporary left-libertarian scholars such as David Ellerman, Michael Otsuka, Hillel Steiner, Peter Vallentyne, and Philippe Van Parijs root an economic egalitarianism in the classical liberal concepts of self-ownership and appropriation. They hold that it is illegitimate for anyone to claim private ownership of natural resources to the detriment of others, a condition John Locke explicated in Two Treatises of Government. Most left-libertarians of this tradition support some form of economic rent redistribution on the grounds that each individual is entitled to an equal share of natural resources and argue for the desirability of state social welfare programs.

Economists since Adam Smith have opined that a land value tax would not cause economic inefficiency, despite their fear that other forms of taxation would do so. It would be a progressive tax, i.e., a tax paid primarily by the wealthy, that increases wages, reduces economic inequality, removes incentives to misuse real estate, and reduces the vulnerability that economies face from credit and property bubbles. Early proponents of this view include radicals such as Hugo Grotius, Thomas Paine, and Herbert Spencer. However, the concept was widely popularized by the political economist and social reformer Henry George.

Individuals in this left-libertarian tradition include George, Locke, Paine, William Ogilvie of Pittensear, Spencer, and more recently, Baruch Brody, Ellerman, James O. Grunebaum, Otsuka, Steiner, Vallentyne and Van Parijs, among others. Roberto Ardigò, Hippolyte de Colins, George, François Huet, William Ogilvie of Pittensear, Paine, Spencer, and Léon Walras are left-libertarians also seen as being within the left-liberal tradition of socialism.

Philosophical anarchist William Godwin, classical economists such as Adam Smith, David Ricardo, Thomas Robert Malthus, Nassau William Senior, Robert Torrens, and the Mills, the early writings of Herbert Spencer, socialists such as Thomas Hodgskin and Pierre-Joseph Proudhon, social reformer Henry George and the Ricardian/Smithian socialists, among others, "provided the basis for the further development of the left libertarian perspective."

Green politics 

Bookchin was one of the main influences behind the formation of the Alliance 90/The Greens, the first green party to win seats in state and national parliaments. Modern green parties attempt to apply these ideas to a more pragmatic system of democratic governance as opposed to contemporary individualist or socialist libertarianism. The green movement, especially its more left-wing factions, is often described by political scientists as left-libertarian.

Political scientists see European political parties such as Ecolo and Groen in Belgium, Alliance 90/The Greens in Germany, or the Green Progressive Accord and GroenLinks in the Netherlands as coming out of the New Left and emphasizing spontaneous self-organisation, participatory democracy, decentralization and voluntarism, being contrasted to the bureaucratic or statist approach. Similarly, political scientist Ariadne Vromen has described the Australian Greens as having a "clear left-libertarian ideological base."

Libertarian socialism 

Libertarian socialism is a left-libertarian tendency within the socialist movement that rejects the state socialist notion of socialism as centralized state ownership and statist control of the economy.

Libertarian socialism emphasises decentralized structures of political organization, asserting that a society based on freedom and justice can be achieved through abolishing authoritarian institutions that control certain means of production and subordinate the majority to an owning class or political and economic elite. Libertarian socialists advocate for decentralized structures based on direct democracy and federal or confederal associations such as citizens' assemblies, libertarian municipalism, trade unions and workers' councils.

Libertarian socialists make a general call for liberty and free association through the identification, criticism and practical dismantling of illegitimate authority in all aspects of human life. Libertarian socialism opposes both authoritarian and vanguardist Bolshevism/Leninism and reformist Fabianism/social democracy.

Market-oriented left-libertarianism 

American Individualist anarchists are opposed to property that gives privilege and is exploitative, seeking to "destroy the tyranny of capital—that is, of property" by mutual credit. Certain American left-wing market anarchists who come from the left-Rothbardian school such as Roderick T. Long and Sheldon Richman, cite Murray Rothbard's homestead principle with approval to support worker cooperatives.

Also referred to as left-wing market anarchists, according to Sheldon Richman in The American Conservative, these proponents of this market-oriented left-libertarian approach strongly affirm the classical liberal ideas of self-ownership and free markets, while maintaining that, taken to their logical conclusions, these ideas support strongly anti-corporatist, anti-hierarchical, pro-labor positions in economics; anti-imperialism in foreign policy; and thoroughly liberal or radical views regarding such cultural issues as gender, sexuality and race. Members of this school typically urge the abolition of the state, arguing that vast disparities in wealth and social influence result from the use of force—especially state power—to steal and engross land and acquire and maintain special privileges. They judge that in a stateless society the kinds of privileges secured by the state will be absent and injustices perpetrated or tolerated by the state can be rectified, concluding that with state interference eliminated it will be possible to achieve "socialist ends by market means."

According to libertarian Sheldon Richman, left-libertarians "favor worker solidarity vis-à-vis bosses, support poor people's squatting on government or abandoned property, and prefer that corporate privileges be repealed before the regulatory restrictions on how those privileges may be exercised." Richman says left-libertarians see Walmart as a symbol of corporate favoritism, being "supported by highway subsidies and eminent domain", viewing "the fictive personhood of the limited-liability corporation with suspicion" and doubting that "Third World sweatshops would be the "best alternative" in the absence of government manipulation." Richman also says left-libertarians also tend to "eschew electoral politics, having little confidence in strategies that work through the government [and] prefer to develop alternative institutions and methods of working around the state."

In the 21st century, left-libertarianism has come to encapsulate forms of free-market anti-capitalism, such as the agorism of Samuel Edward Konkin III and mutualism of Pierre-Joseph Proudhon and Benjamin Tucker.

Steiner–Vallentyne school 
Contemporary left-libertarian scholars such as David Ellerman, Michael Otsuka, Hillel Steiner, Peter Vallentyne and Philippe Van Parijs root an economic egalitarianism in the classical liberal concepts of self-ownership and land appropriation, combined with geoist or physiocratic views regarding the ownership of land and natural resources (e.g. those of Henry George and John Locke).

Scholars representing this school of left-libertarianism often understand their position in contrast to right-libertarians, who maintain that there are no fair share constraints on use or appropriation that individuals have the power to appropriate unowned things by claiming them (usually by mixing their labor with them) and deny any other conditions or considerations are relevant and that there is no justification for the state to redistribute resources to the needy or to overcome market failures. A number of left-libertarians of this school argue for the desirability of some state social welfare programs. Left-libertarians of the Carson–Long left-libertarianism school typically endorse the labor-based property rights that Steiner–Vallentyne left-libertarians reject, but they hold that implementing such rights would have radical rather than conservative consequences.

Left-libertarians of the Steiner–Vallentyne type hold that it is illegitimate for anyone to claim private ownership of natural resources to the detriment of others. These left-libertarians support some form of income redistribution on the grounds of a claim by each individual to be entitled to an equal share of natural resources. Unappropriated natural resources are either unowned or owned in common and private appropriation is only legitimate if everyone can appropriate an equal amount or if private appropriation is taxed to compensate those who are excluded from natural resources.

See also 

 Cellular democracy
 Civil libertarianism
 Cultural liberalism
 Cultural radicalism
 Drug liberalization
 Grassroots democracy
 Individualist feminism
 Left-libertarians (category)
 Libertarian Democrat
 Libertarian municipalism
 Libertarian paternalism
 Libertarian transhumanism
 Outline of libertarianism
 Lockean proviso
 Market socialism
 Radical movement
 Refusal of work

References 
Notes

Further reading

 
 
 Vallentyne, Peter (2000). "Left-Libertarianism: A Primer" (full text; final draft). In Vallentyne, Peter; Steiner, Hillel (eds.). Left Libertarianism and Its Critics: The Contemporary Debate. Palgrave Publishers Ltd. pp. 1–20.

External links
 
 

 
Anarchism
Georgism
Libertarianism
Libertarian socialism
Libertarianism
Libertarianism by form
Libertarianism in the United States
Socialism